Gordon Holmes may refer to:

 The pseudonym of the journalist Louis Tracy (1863–1928)
 Sir Gordon Morgan Holmes (1876–1965), Anglo-Irish neurologist
 Gordon Holmes, lab technician who shot a home video he claims may show the Loch Ness Monster
 Gordon Holmes (American football), American football player
 Gordon Holmes (suffragette), a British stockbroker, suffragette, trade unionist, and author (1884–1951)